Persatuan Sepak Bola Indonesia Raja Ampat, commonly known as Persiram Raja Ampat, or Persiram, was an Indonesian professional football club based in Raja Ampat Islands, West Papua. They last competed in the Indonesia Super League before being acquired by PS TNI in 2016. Their nicknames are Dewa Laut (Sea God) and Laskar Bahari (Sea Warriors).

History 
The club was founded on 11 April 2004. The team home jersey is black with blue stripes. They finished the 2010–11 Liga Indonesia Premier Division in top eight position but because of dualism in PSSI some teams decided to participate in the Indonesia Premier League, this gave Persiram direct promotion to the 2011–12 Indonesia Super League.

On 30 March 2016, this club was officially acquired by PS TNI. The acquisition process conducted through PT. Arka Gega Magna and the total costs incurred to take over was 17 billion rupiah.

Stadium 

The club plays their home matches in Wombik Kilometer 16 Stadium in Sorong, West Papua. They immediately moved to Maguwoharjo Stadium for the 2014 Indonesia Super League season.

See also 
 List of football clubs in Indonesia
 PS TNI

References

External links 
 Official website 
 Persiram Raja Ampat at Liga Indonesia

Football clubs in Indonesia
Association football clubs established in 2004
2004 establishments in Indonesia
2016 disestablishments in Indonesia
Association football clubs disestablished in 2016
Defunct football clubs in Indonesia